L. Bhoominathan is an Indian film editor who works in Malayalam cinema. He has been credited with editing 115 films to date. He has won the Kerala State Film Award for Best Editor three times. His most noteworthy works include Ninnishtam Ennishtam, His Highness Abdullah, Bharatham, Aaram Thamburan and Narashimham. He worked in most of the films of the directors Sibi Malayil, Shaji Kailas and Ranjith. He was one of the jury members of 50th Kerala State Film Awards.

Awards
Kerala State Film Awards
 1996 – Best Editor – Kaanaakkinaavu
 1997 – Best Editor – Asuravamsam
 2006 – Best Editor – Vaasthavam

References

External links
 

Malayalam film editors
Living people
Kerala State Film Award winners
Film editors from Kerala
Year of birth missing (living people)